Sins of the Parents may refer to:
 Sins of the Parents (1914 film), a silent film
 Sins of the Parents (1919 film), a German silent film